Michel Hulin (born 31 January 1936) is a French philosopher specialised on Indian philosophy.

Biography
Michel Hulin was born on 31 January 1936. An alumn of the École normale supérieure, he obtained his doctorate in philosophy from the Paris-Sorbonne University in 1977 with a dissertation on the Vedic concept of ahamkara. He was a professor of Indian and comparative philosophy at Paris-Sorbonne from 1981 to 1998. His research has focused on classical Indian philosophy, such as the nondualism in Vedanta, Tantric-inspired texts in Shaivism and the confrontations between European and Asian traditions of thought.

Selected bibliography
 Le Principe de l'ego dans la pensée indienne classique : La notion d' ahamkara, Paris, 1978.
 Hegel et l'Orient, Paris, 1979.
 La Face cachée du temps : l'imaginaire de l'au-delà, Paris, Fayard, 1985, .
 Sept récits initiatiques tirés du yoga-vasistha : l'imaginaire de l'au-delà, Paris, Berg International, 1987, .
 La mystique sauvage, Paris, PUF, 1993, .
 Qu'est-ce que l'ignorance métaphysique (dans la pensée hindoue)? : Śaṅkara, Paris, Vrin, 1994, .
 L'Inde inspiratrice : Réception de l'Inde en France et en Allemagne, XIXe-XXe siècles, Paris, PUS, 1997, .
 L'Inde des Sages, Paris, Ed. du Félin, 2000, .
 Comment la philosophie indienne s'est-elle développée ? : La querelle brahmanes-bouddhistes, Paris, Editions du Panama, 2008, .
 La Bhagavad-Gita, Paris, Points, coll. « Points Sagesses », 2010, .
 Shankara et la non-dualité, Paris, Almora, 2017, .

References

1936 births
Living people
20th-century French philosophers
21st-century French philosophers
French Indologists
Hegel scholars
École Normale Supérieure alumni
Academic staff of Paris-Sorbonne University